Sanjit Sil (born 3 October 1944) is an Indian former cricketer. He played one first-class match for Bengal in 1963/64.

See also
 List of Bengal cricketers

References

External links
 

1944 births
Living people
Indian cricketers
Bengal cricketers
People from Hooghly district